Byron Rogers (born 5 April 1942) is a Welsh journalist, essayist, historian and biographer. In August 2007, the University of Edinburgh awarded him the James Tait Black Memorial Prize for the best biography published in the previous year, for The Man Who Went Into the West: The Life of RS Thomas. The Archbishop of Canterbury, Rowan Williams, said of the book: "Byron Rogers's lively and affectionate biography is unexpectedly, even riotously, funny."

Born and raised in Carmarthenshire, Rogers now lives in Northamptonshire. He has written for the Sunday Telegraph and The Guardian, and was once speech writer for the Prince of Wales. It has been written of his essays that he is "a historian of the quirky and forgotten, of people and places other journalists don't even know exist or ignore if they do".

Bibliography

Essays
An Audience with an Elephant, Aurum, 2001.
The Green Lane to Nowhere: the Life of an English Village, Aurum, 2002.
The Bank Manager and the Holy Grail: travels to the wilder reaches of Wales, Aurum, 2003.
The Last Human Cannonball, Aurum, 2004.
Three Journeys, Gomer Press, 2011.

Biography
The Last Englishman, the Life of J. L. Carr, Aurum, 2003.
The Man Who Went Into the West, the Life of R. S. Thomas, Aurum, 2006.
Me: The Authorised Biography, Aurum, 2009.

History
The Lost Children, Gregynog, 2005.

References

Note on Byron Rogers 
BBC Wales 

Living people
James Tait Black Memorial Prize recipients
People from Carmarthen
Welsh biographers
Welsh essayists
Welsh journalists
1942 births